Jacutinga may refer to:

Biology
Black-fronted piping guan, or jacutinga, a New World bird

Places
Jacutinga, Minas Gerais Brazil
Jacutinga, Rio Grande do Sul, Brazil
Santa Rita de Jacutinga, Minas Gerais, Brazil